Skyland is a CGI animated television series.

Skyland may also refer to a location in the United States:

Skyland, Nevada, a census-designated place
Skyland, North Carolina, an unincorporated community
Skyland, Washington, D.C., a neighborhood in Southeast Washington, D.C.
Skyland Conference, a New Jersey high school sports association
Skyland Resort, a small privately owned resort on Skyline Drive in the Shenandoah National Park
Skyland Special,  Southern Railway (U.S.) train from Asheville, North Carolina to Jacksonville, Florida

See also
Skylands 
Skylanders, a video game series